Parvoscincus palaliensis  is a species of skink found in the Philippines.

References

Parvoscincus
Reptiles described in 2013
Taxa named by Charles W. Linkem
Taxa named by Rafe M. Brown